Alan King (born 18 January 1945) is an English footballer who played as a left half for Tranmere Rovers, Ellesmere Port, Runcorn, Bangor City and Marine. He made 385 appearances for Tranmere, and 341 in the Football League, scoring 38 goals.

King is currently a matchday host for Tranmere.

References

1945 births
Living people
Sportspeople from Birkenhead
Association football wing halves
Tranmere Rovers F.C. players
Ellesmere Port Town F.C. players
Runcorn F.C. Halton players
Bangor City F.C. players
Marine F.C. players
English Football League players
English footballers